Lieutenant-General Julian Hamilton Hall (17 January 1837 – 15 August 1911) was a British Army officer who became General Officer Commanding North Western District.

Military career
Born the son of Sir John Hall, 5th Baronet, Hall was commissioned as an ensign in the Coldstream Guards on 2 August 1854. He saw action in the Crimean War. He became commanding officer of the Cheshire Regiment in May 1883 before moving on to be Assistant-Adjutant and Quartermaster-General at Headquarters Home District in December 1884 and General Officer Commanding North Western District in April 1890; he retired in April 1895.

References

1837 births
1911 deaths
British Army lieutenant generals
Cheshire Regiment officers
Coldstream Guards officers
British Army personnel of the Crimean War